KQAQ (970 AM) is a radio station broadcasting a religious format. Licensed to Austin, Minnesota, United States, the station serves the Austin-Albert Lea and Rochester, MN areas. The station is currently owned by Real Presence Radio of Grand Forks.

The station previously aired The Fan sports programming under the call sign KNFX, until being sold from Clear Channel in 2008.

References

External links

Radio stations established in 1960
Catholic radio stations
Christian radio stations in Minnesota